Best Original Score of the Year Not Released on an Album is one of two categories at the World Soundtrack Awards that was retired after the first year of the World Soundtrack Awards. The other was the World Soundtrack Award for Most Creative Use of Existing Material on a Soundtrack.

Winner and nominees

2001 Bridget Jones's Diary - Patrick Doyle
Antitrust - Don Davis
Blow - Graeme Revell
Moulin Rouge! - Craig Armstrong
Pauline & Paulette - Frédéric Devreese

References
World Soundtrack Awards at IMDb
World Soundtrack Academy

Notes

World Soundtrack Awards